Hurry On (7 May 1913 – 1936) was an undefeated  British Thoroughbred racehorse and sire that revived the Matchem sire line. English trainer Fred Darling called Hurry On the best horse he ever trained.

Breeding
Hurry On was by Marcovil, who won two races and was an ordinary sire. His dam was the unraced Toute Suite by Sainfoin, who sired English Triple Crown winner Rock Sand. Marcovil was inbred to Hermit in the 3rd remove. Hurry On cost his Scotch whisky producer owner James Buchanan, later Baron Woolavington, 500 guineas as a yearling. He was a late colt, having been foaled on 7 May, but he matured into a 17 hands high horse.

Racing record
As he was a backward late colt, Hurry On was not raced as a two-year-old and was not entered in The Derby. He was undefeated in all of his six three-year-old starts, ranging in distance from 8 to 14 furlongs, which included the wartime St. Leger at Newmarket Racecourse and the Jockey Club Cup.

Stud record
Hurry On sired Epsom Derby winner Captain Cuttle from the first mare he covered at stud and was the Leading sire in Great Britain & Ireland in 1926, the year his colt Coronach emulated Captain Cuttle at Epsom. He sired a third Derby winner in Call Boy, as well as two Epsom Oaks winners, Pennycomequick and Toboggan, and two 1,000 Guineas winners, Plack and Cresta Run. In 1921 his stud fee was 200 guineas.

These sons of Hurry On sired further stakes-winners:
Captain Cuttle (GB) 1919, exported to Italy  
Coronach (GB) 1923, sired two winners of the Italian Derby before he was given away and exported to New Zealand, where he was a successful sire that produced 16 stakes winners for 23 stakes wins.
Defoe (GB) 1926, successful sire in New Zealand
Excitement (IRE) 1927, successful sire in Australia of Russia (Melbourne Cup) and others
 Hunter’s Moon (GB) 1926, pedigree influence in several South American countries, including direct sire lines still existing on that continent
Hunting Song (IRE) 1919, a leading sire in New Zealand for six successive years
Precipitation, a successful racehorse and sire that maintained the Matchem sireline
 Roger De Busli (GB) 1920, exported to Australia, sire of Rogilla (Sydney Cup etc.)

Hurry On's daughters produced seven Classics winners, including Court Martial. This led to him becoming the Leading broodmare sire in Great Britain & Ireland in 1938, 1944 and 1945.

Pedigree

See also
 List of leading Thoroughbred racehorses

References

 The Complete Encyclopedia of Horse Racing - by Bill Mooney and George Ennor

External links
Thoroughbred Heritage: Hurry On

1913 racehorse births
1936 racehorse deaths
Racehorses bred in the United Kingdom
Racehorses trained in the United Kingdom
British Champion Thoroughbred Sires
British Champion Thoroughbred broodmare sires
Undefeated racehorses
Thoroughbred family 2-d
Godolphin Arabian sire line
Chefs-de-Race
St Leger winners